Fahad Al-Dossari (born 1 January 2002) is a Saudi Arabian professional footballer who plays as a winger or a left back for Al-Kholood on loan from Al-Ettifaq.

Career
Al-Dossari started his career at the youth team of Al-Ettifaq and represented the club at every level. On 11 October 2020, he signed his first professional contract with the club. He was first called up to the first-team during the 2020–21 season. He made his debut on 25 May 2021 in the league match against Al-Raed. On 28 January 2023, Al-Dossari joined Al-Kholood on loan.

Career statistics

Club

References

External links
 

Living people
2002 births
People from Dammam
Association football wingers
Association football fullbacks
Saudi Arabian footballers
Saudi Arabia youth international footballers
Ettifaq FC players
Al-Kholood Club players
Saudi Professional League players
Saudi First Division League players